Pink gin was historically used to reference a type of cocktail made fashionable in England in the mid-19th century, consisting of Plymouth gin and a dash of Angostura bitters, a dark red bitters that makes the whole drink pinkish. In recent years, the term Pink gin has also been used to define a specific category of gin where a range of fruits and flavourings are infused into the gin to give it a pink color.

Lemon rind is also commonly used as a garnish, with the citrus essential oils subtly complementing the flavour.

Origins 
Pink gin is widely thought to have been created by members of the Royal Navy. Plymouth gin is a 'sweet' gin, as opposed to London gin which is 'dry', and was added to Angostura bitters to make the consumption of Angostura bitters more enjoyable as they were used as a treatment for sea sickness in 1824 by Dr. Johann Gottlieb Benjamin Siegert.

The Royal Navy then brought the idea for the drink to bars in England, where this method of serving was first noted on the mainland. By the 1870s, gin was becoming increasingly popular and many of the finer establishments in England were serving pink gins.

Variations 
A typical pink gin is one part gin and one dash of angostura bitters.

Though there are no major variations of pink gin, many bartenders vary the amount of angostura bitters used. Typically the drink is topped up with iced water, rarely without water.

A bartender may ask customers whether they want it "in or out", upon which the bartender swirls the angostura bitters around the glass before either leaving it in, or pouring it out (leaving only a residue), and then adding the gin.

It is also common for pink gin to be served as 'pink gin and tonic', typically consisting of 4 dashes of angostura bitters and 2 shots of gin, which is then topped up with tonic water. This is served in a highball glass over ice, and then can be garnished with lemon.

Cedric Charles Dickens (great-grandson of Charles Dickens) records in Drinking With Dickens that a 'Burnt Pink Gin' consists of 1 tsp Angostura set afire by heating over a flame and then poured into a large tot of dry gin, adding cold water to taste.

See also 

 Bitters
 Gin
 List of cocktails

References 

Cocktails with gin
Cocktails with Angostura bitters